The George Hotel, Kilmarnock, Scotland was built in the 19th century and is "B" Listed. The building is  situated on land at the top of Portland Street. This land was once the home of Kilmarnock Bowling Club. It was one of the top hotels in the area. The George was Kilmarnock's 5-star hotel. The hotel closed in 1920. There were plans for the hotel to be demolished when the Town Council purchased the property, but the plans were changed. The same year as the George Hotel closed part of the building was adapted and used as the George Cinema.

The three story building still remains today. The building still looks similar to the way it did in the days of the George Hotel. Nowadays the building is used by Mason Murphy as a furniture shop and the rest of the property is a disco.

Notable residents

Woodrow Wilson - stayed at the hotel on 5 July 1899.

References 

Category B listed buildings in East Ayrshire
Buildings and structures in Kilmarnock